Dorian Josey Bailey (born January 28, 1997) is an American soccer midfielder who currently plays for the Washington Spirit in the National Women's Soccer League (NWSL).

Early life
Bailey grew up in the Kansas City metropolitan area and went to St. Teresa's Academy.

North Carolina Tar Heels
Bailey attended University of North Carolina where she played for the North Carolina Tar Heels from 2015 to 2018. In 2015, she was named to the Freshman All-ACC Team. In four years, she played in 86 games, scoring 17 times and registering 17 assists.

Club career

Washington Spirit
Bailey was drafted 8th overall in the first round of the 2019 NWSL College Draft by the Washington Spirit. In April, she was signed to their active roster in advance of the 2019 NWSL season. Bailey made her first professional appearance on April 13, 2019, as a 79th-minute substitute in Washington's season opening win over Sky Blue FC.

International career
In 2013, Bailey was called up to the United States under-17 national team, winning a bronze medal in the 2013 CONCACAF Women's U-17 Championship. She scored her first youth international goal in a group stage win over Guatemala. In April 2014, she received an invitation to the United States under-18 squad's training camp. The following year, Bailey received invitations to training camps with both the United States under-19 and United States under-20 national teams. Bailey played in the 2018 Thorns Spring Invitational with the United States under-23 national team.

References

External links
 Washington Spirit player profile
 Soccerway player profile

1997 births
Living people
American women's soccer players
North Carolina Tar Heels women's soccer players
National Women's Soccer League players
Soccer players from Kansas
Washington Spirit draft picks
Washington Spirit players
Women's association football midfielders